Boris Vladimirovich Derjaguin (or Deryagin) (9 August 1902 in Moscow – 16 May 1994) was a Soviet and Russian chemist. As a member of the Russian Academy of Sciences, he laid the foundation of the modern science of colloids and surfaces. An epoch in the development of the physical chemistry of colloids and surfaces is associated with his name.

Derjaguin became famous in scientific circles for his work on the stability of colloids and thin films of liquids which is now known as the DLVO theory, after the initials of its authors: Derjaguin, Landau, Verwey, and Overbeek. It is universally included in text books on colloid chemistry and is still widely applied in modern studies of interparticle forces in colloids. In particular, the Derjaguin approximation is widely used in order to approximate the interaction between curved surfaces from a knowledge of the interaction for planar ones.

Derjaguin was also briefly involved in polywater research during the 1960s and early 1970s. This field claimed that if water was heated then cooled in quartz capillaries, it took on astonishing new properties. Eventually, the scientists who were involved in polywater admitted it did not exist, claiming they were misled by poorly designed experiments (Derjaguin rejected polywater in 1973).

He is also known for having hotly rejected some of the then-new ideas of adhesion as presented by the Western bloc in the 1970s. His model came to be known as the DMT (after Derjaguin, Muller and Toporov) model, while the model presented by Western bloc scientists came to be known as the JKR (after Johnson, Kendall and Roberts) model for adhesive elastic contact. This rejection proved to be instrumental in the development of the Tabor and later Maugis parameters that quantify which contact model (of the JKR and DMT models) represent adhesive contact better for specific materials.

Selected works

From 1980 onwards

Reprints

See also
Lifshitz theory of van der Waals force

References

1902 births
1994 deaths
20th-century Russian chemists
20th-century Russian physicists
Scientists from Moscow
Corresponding Members of the USSR Academy of Sciences
Full Members of the Russian Academy of Sciences
Members of the German Academy of Sciences Leopoldina
Recipients of the Order of the Red Banner of Labour
Recipients of the USSR State Prize
Tribologists
Russian chemists
Russian physical chemists
Russian physicists
Soviet chemists
Soviet physical chemists
Soviet physicists
Burials at Vagankovo Cemetery